Total Dictation is an annual educational event that has been held in Russia and other countries to popularize literacy. It originated at the Novosibirsk State University in 2004.

History
The first Total Dictation was held at the student Glum Club of the Humanities Faculty of Novosibirsk State University.

The first 6 dictations were written at NSU in Novosibirsk, the texts were taken from the works of Russian classics.

In 2011, Dmitry Bykov became the author of the text for the Total Dictation, and the event became popular not only in Novosibirsk, but also in other parts of Russia and even in the United States.

In 2014, Total Dictation was held on six continents, in 352 cities and 47 countries. 64 thousand Russian speakers decided to test their literacy. The northernmost point of the dictation was Dixon on Taimyr, and the southernmost was the Vostok Station. The most western point was San Jose (California, USA), and the most eastern place was Auckland (New Zealand). The event was attended by cosmonaut Oleg Artemyev from the International Space Station. Bishkek, Tallinn, Pavlodar and Riga became the leaders in terms of the number of participants among foreign cities.

External links
 Тотальный диктант: история ошибок за все годы. Вечерний Новосибирск.

Culture in Novosibirsk
Education in Novosibirsk
Novosibirsk State University
Russian culture
Russian language tests
2004 in Russia
2004 in education